The Walter Sisulu Local Municipality council was formed in 2016, and consists of twenty-two members elected by mixed-member proportional representation. Eleven councillors are elected by first-past-the-post voting in eleven wards, while the remaining eleven are chosen from party lists so that the total number of party representatives is proportional to the number of votes received.

In the election of 1 November 2021, the African National Congress (ANC) won a reduced majority of twelve seats.

Results 
The following table shows the composition of the council after past elections.

August 2016 election

The following table shows the results of the 2016 election.

By-elections from August 2016 to November 2021

In a by-election held on 8 August 2018, a ward previously held by an ANC councillor was won by the DA candidate. Council composition was reconfigured as seen below:

November 2021 election

The following table shows the results of the 2021 election.

References

Walter Sisulu
Elections in the Eastern Cape
Joe Gqabi District Municipality